Louis Latouche (20 September 1829 - 24 August 1883) was a French painter, pigment dealer, framer and art dealer, notable as a defender of Impressionism. He was born in La Ferté-sous-Jouarre and died in hospital at Saint-Dié-des-Vosges.

He was a friend and supplier to several painters, dealing with them via his wife. Their shop was at the corner of rue Laffitte and rue La Fayette in Paris. Their clients and friends included Camille Pissaro, Paul Gachet and Amand Gautier, with whom he often went to Berck. He supported them, exhibiting their work and letting them meet in his home in the evenings- it was there that they originated the idea of a 'salon des refusés', supported by Alfred Sisley, Camille Pissarro, Frédéric Bazille and Auguste Renoir, who lodged a petition for such a salon in 1867.

References

Bibliography (in French) 
 Sophie Monneret, L'Impressionnisme et son époque, vol. 2, t. 1, Paris, Robert Laffont, 1987, 997 p.
 Sophie Monneret, L'Impressionnisme et son époque, vol. 2, t. II, Paris, 1987, 1185 p.
 Lionello Venturi, Les Archives de l'impressionnisme, Paris, Durand-Ruel, 1939, 410 p.
 Gérald Schurr, Les petits maîtres de la peinture, 1820-1920, valeur de demain, vol. 7, t. IV, Paris, Éditions de l’amateur, 1979 (OCLC 417341878)

19th-century French painters
1829 births
1883 deaths
People from La Ferté-sous-Jouarre